The Palmellaceae are a family of green algae, specifically of the Chlamydomonadales.

References

External links

Scientific references

Scientific databases

Chlorophyceae families
Chlamydomonadales